The Grand-Ouest is a geographical area of France that encompasses Brittany and Pays de la Loire. 

Traditionally, this area has a very agriculture-based economy.

The largest cities are Rennes and Nantes.

References

Subdivisions of France